Tecozautla (Otomi: Masofo) is a town and one of the 84 municipalities of Hidalgo, in central-eastern Mexico.  The municipality covers an area of 575.6 km². The name derives from the Nahuatl words "tetl", meaning "stone"; "cozaqui", meaning "yellow thing"; and "tla", meaning "place of"; making the entire meaning of Tecozautla "place where yellow earth abounds".

As of 2005, the municipality had a total population of 31,609. In 2017 there were 2,415 inhabitants who spoke an indigenous language, primarily Mezquital Otomi. The town was declared a "Pueblo Mágico" in 2015.

References 

Municipalities of Hidalgo (state)
Populated places in Hidalgo (state)
Otomi settlements

Pueblos Mágicos